German Pole may refer to:
German Pole (politician), member of Parliament for Derbyshire in 1656
German minority in Poland
Polish minority in Germany

See also
German–Polish relations